Graeme Blundell (born 7 August 1945) is an Australian actor, director, producer, writer, playwright, lyricist and biographer

Early life
Blundell was born on 7 April 1945 in Melbourne; he grew up in the suburb of Clifton Hill. He was educated at Merrilands College and Coburg High School, where he served as a Prefect. He then studied arts at the University of Melbourne, where he resided at Ormond College and became involved in student theatre. He has a younger brother, Dennis, and two younger sisters, Margaret and Kathryn.

Career
In his early years, Blundell worked at La Mama Theatre, the Pram Factory, Hoopla, the Playbox Theatre Company, and the Melbourne Theatre Company. He directed and acted in the premiere performance of Jack Hibberd's play Dimboola at La Mama. His first television appearance was as an uncredited extra in the debut episode of Homicide (1964). He is best known as playing the title character in the 1973 sex-comedy film Alvin Purple and its 1974 sequel, Alvin Rides Again.

He has written extensively in The Australian newspaper as well as writing biographies of Brett Whiteley (Brett Whiteley: An Unauthorised Life, 1996, with his then wife Margot Hilton), and Graham Kennedy.

From March 2011, Blundell hosted Sunday Night at the Movies with Graeme Blundell on Foxtel's Fox Classics channel.

On 29 January 2015, it was announced that Margaret Pomeranz had signed with Foxtel to present a new film and television program on Foxtel Arts, along with Graeme Blundell, a series called Screen. The series was renewed in 2018. , Blundell continues to appear in Screen, and past episodes are uploaded to YouTube. He is also TV writer for The Australian newspaper.

Personal life
Blundell has been married to playwright Kerry Dwyer, author Margot Hilton, and journalist Susan Kurosawa.

Filmography
1969: Two Thousand Weeks – Journalist
1970: Brake Fluid
1971: Stork – Westy
1973: Alvin Purple – Alvin Purple
1974: The Box (TV series) – Don Cook
1974: Alvin Rides Again – Alvin Purple / Balls McGee
1976: Mad Dog Morgan – Italian Jack
1976: Alvin Purple (TV series) – Alvin Purple
1976: Don's Party – Simon
1978: Weekend of Shadows – Bernie
1979: The Odd Angry Shot – 'Dawson' / Dawson
1979: Kostas – John
1981: Pacific Banana – Martin
1981: Doctors and Nurses – Mr X
1982: The Best of Friends – Tom
1983: Midnite Spares – Sidebottom
1984: Melvin, Son of Alvin – Alvin Purple
1986: Australian Dream – Geoffrey Stubbs
1987: Those Dear Departed – Dr. Howie
1987: The Year My Voice Broke – Nils Olson
1994: Gino – Larry Stone
1996: Idiot Box – Detective Eric
1999: Looking for Alibrandi – Ron Bishop
2002: Star Wars: Episode II – Attack of the Clones – Ruwee Naberrie (scenes deleted)
2005: Star Wars: Episode III – Revenge of the Sith – Ruwee Naberrie
2008: The Hollowmen (TV Series) – Geoff
2009: In Her Skin – Ivan

Writing
 Brett Whiteley: An Unauthorised Life, with Margot Hilton (Macmillan, 1996)
 King: The Life and Comedy of Graham Kennedy (Pan Macmillan, 2003)
 Australian Theatre: Backstage with Graeme Blundell (edited) (Oxford University Press, 1997)
 The Naked Truth: A Life in Parts (Hachette Australia, 2008)

References

External links
 Graeme Blundell at the National Film and Sound Archive

1945 births
Australian biographers
Male biographers
Australian male film actors
Australian male stage actors
Australian male television actors
Living people
Writers from Melbourne
Theatre directors from Melbourne
The Australian journalists